Gustav Aaron Youngquist (4 November 1885 – 29 October 1959) was a Swedish-American lawyer and public prosecutor. He served as Minnesota Attorney General and as the Assistant U.S. Attorney General who successfully prosecuted Al Capone for federal income tax evasion.

Early life and education
Youngquist was born near Gothenburg, Sweden, and moved to the United States as a small child with his family. He enrolled at William Mitchell College of Law (then the St. Paul College of Law) and graduated in 1909.

Career
Following graduation, he entered into partnership with Charles Loring, a future Chief Justice of the Minnesota Supreme Court.  Youngquist served as Polk County attorney  (1915-1918). Later, he successfully ran for the offices of the Attorney for Carver County. In February 1928, he was appointed Minnesota Attorney General  by Governor Theodore Christianson to fill the vacancy caused by the death of Albert F. Pratt.

In 1929, the state Republican Party tried to draft Youngquist as their gubernatorial candidate for the next year's election. Instead, U.S. Attorney General William D. Mitchell convinced Youngquist to accept a position at the Department of Justice, where he was charged with enforcing national prohibition laws of the Volstead Act. He remained there until 1933, having argued between sixty and seventy cases before the U.S. Supreme Court and overseen the trial and sentencing of Al Capone. Youngquist practiced actively following his return to Minnesota. He also served on the U.S. Supreme Court's Advisory Committee on the Rules of Federal Criminal Procedure.

References

Further reading
 

1885 births
1959 deaths
Minnesota Attorneys General
William Mitchell College of Law alumni
Minnesota lawyers
Minnesota Republicans
Swedish emigrants to the United States
20th-century American politicians
20th-century American lawyers